Cristóbal Corrales (born 23 April 1947) is a Honduran sprinter. He competed in the men's 200 metres at the 1968 Summer Olympics.

References

1947 births
Living people
Athletes (track and field) at the 1968 Summer Olympics
Honduran male sprinters
Olympic athletes of Honduras
Place of birth missing (living people)